Responsible Travel is an activist travel company offering over 6,000 responsible holidays from 400 holiday providers around the world. In 2018 annual sales were £20.8m and the company took 16,500 passengers. It is one of the world’s largest green travel companies and an ABTA member. It is also a travel publisher and has published over 650 destination guides as of March 2019.

The company sells holidays designed to maximise the benefit and minimise the harm involved in tourism and was the first of its kind in the world.
Holidays are screened for their compliance with environmental, social and economic criteria with an emphasis on grassroot initiatives and local providers. The company asks travellers to leave reviews, rating their holidays and the social and environmental credentials from 5 to 1.

Responsible Travel was founded in 2001 by Justin Francis (British entrepreneur) and Professor Harold Goodwin, Director at The International Centre for Responsible Tourism.

Dame Anita Roddick of The Body Shop was one of the first investors, believing that: “Responsible travellers want experiences rather than packages, authenticity rather than superficial exoticism and holidays that put a little bit back into local communities and conservation. This is the future of tourism.”
The company introduces travellers directly to responsible travel and tourism options including accommodation owners and holiday providers.

According to Simon Calder, Travel Editor at The Independent, “the ResponsibleTravel business model overturned conventional travel thinking. Instead of intervening between the travel enterprise and the tourist, as most agents do, Francis urges them to talk directly.” In 2010 www.responsiblevacation.com was launched in the US. The company is based in Brighton, East Sussex UK. As of November 2018 there were 31 employees.

Responsible travel and tourism
Responsible Travel was the "first online guide to responsible international travel". Responsible travel and tourism is about making better places for people to live in and to visit. One of the founding principles of Responsible Travel was to help create this new sector of the travel and tourism industry and to firmly root it in ethical values.

Activities

World Responsible Tourism Awards 

In 2004, Justin Francis founded The Responsible Tourism Awards, which were organised by Responsible Travel and hosted by World Travel Market as part of World Responsible Tourism Day. Professor Harold Goodwin of the International Centre for Responsible Tourism is Chair of the Judges. The Awards aim to inspire change in the tourism industry by celebrating those organisations, destinations and individuals working innovatively with local cultures, communities and biodiversity - at the forefront of responsible tourism.

Trip For A Trip 

In November 2016 Responsible Travel began funding day trips for children around the world to visit a local tourist attraction that they may never had had the privilege of visiting before. The company asks its customers to ‘opt in’ to the scheme to offer a child the opportunity to appreciate more deeply the value of their own wildlife, landscapes, history and culture. Actor and traveller Michael Palin said: “Trip For A Trip sounds an excellent idea.  My appetite for travel began with day trips, so I know how much they can mean to a child.  Good luck and thanks to all who can make this happen.”

Zoos 

In April 2017 Responsible Travel stopped promoting holidays that included a visit to a zoo, describing them as “relics of the past”. The move was supported by The Born Free Foundation and was praised by actress Joanna Lumley:
"It only takes one to create a movement for change and it is fabulous to see a travel company being brave, sticking their heads above the parapet and saying that in 2017 keeping animals in captivity purely for our entertainment is just not acceptable. There are so many superb ways to learn about and appreciate animals in the wild; we should be encouraging people to get out into nature, not watching wildlife behind bars. I hope that more companies will follow this excellent example".

Elephants and tourism 

After consulting with local suppliers, NGOs and animal welfare experts, in 2014 Responsible Travel published a detailed guide on elephants in tourism, including the rights and wrongs of elephant trekking.
The company also changed its own policy and removed elephant trekking and elephant performance trips from its collection.

Whales and dolphins in captivity 
In April 2014 the company launched a public petition to urge travel companies to stop selling tickets to establishments keeping whales and dolphins (collectively known as cetaceans) for public entertainment purposes. They also released a poll, along with The Born Free Foundation, demonstrating that 86% of the public no longer wished to see cetaceans in captivity. On 29 July 2018, UK tour operator, Thomas Cook finally announced that they would stop selling trips to SeaWorld.

Orphanage volunteering 

In July 2013, Responsible Travel temporarily suspended 10 trips that involved volunteering at orphanages around the world for ethical reasons. The company was concerned that well-intentioned volunteers were fuelling a demand for ‘fake orphans’ – and children were being separated from their families and communities as a result, causing long term psychological and emotional developmental problems.

After formulating a working group which included ECPAT, Save the Children, Friends International, People & Places, Professor Harold Goodwin and Daniela Papi, an international advocate for responsible volunteering, the company published new guidelines for partner organisations wishing to promote any trip that involved volunteering with vulnerable children. As a result, 43 trips were removed from the website in total.

Carbon offsetting 

In 2002 Responsible Travel became one of the first companies to offer carbon offsets. In October 2009, Responsible Travel stopped offering carbon offsetting  claiming that people were using the offset as an excuse to pollute more.
Responsible Travel founder, Justin Francis told The New York Times that offsets had become a “magic pill, a kind of get-out-of-jail-free card,”  distracting people from making more significant behavioral changes, like flying less.

Had Enough 

In 2004 the company launched a campaign urging three of the UK’s largest travel companies – Thomas Cook, Thomson and MyTravel, to implement responsible tourism policies. The ‘Had Enough’ petition was launched after research showed widespread dissatisfaction with mass tourism among ordinary travellers. A year later, all three had published their first Responsible Business policies.

"Overtourism" concerns 
In 2017 and 2018, several major news outlets published articles citing the problems caused by an excessive number of tourists in cities such as Venice, Barcelona, Cornwall in England, and Amsterdam.   
 Reports in The Guardian have often quoted Justin Francis, one of the founders of Responsible Travel, who stated that steps must be taken to limit the number of visitors that are producing an "overtourism crisis", in addition to "managing tourism more responsibly".

"Ultimately, residents must be prioritised over tourists for housing, infrastructure and access to services because they have a long-term stake in the city’s success", he said. Limits on the number of visitors during peak periods have already been set by cities such as London, New York, Reykjavik, Amsterdam and Paris. Francis understands the rationale. "Some destinations may just have too many tourists" and that issue calls for strategies such as taxation, demarketing and limiting accommodation for tourists.

In July 2018, Responsible Travel released its first documentary film: Crowded Out: The Story of Overtourism. Presented by Justin Francis and directed by Beth Walker, the film documents the issue of overtourism from the perspective of local people in hotspots such as Venice and Barcelona, as well as further afield in places such as the Gili Islands.

Turtle hatcheries 
In 2018 Responsible Travel was the first travel company to implement a policy on sea turtle hatcheries, following concerns about the conditions in some hatcheries. It published guidelines for volunteers and tourists wishing to visit one.

Plastic-free travel 
In May 2018 the company launched a ‘no single use plastic’ holiday section and a plastic-free holiday guide.

Fake snow 
In winter 2017, Responsible Travel stopped promoting holidays that take place in artificial snow environments.  Their concerns include the amount of water needed to manufacture artificial snow, the noise from snow machines and the use of chemicals in snow production and their effects on wildlife.

Nature Positive Travel 
In November 2021 at COP26 in Glasgow, Justin Francis, Liv Garfield and DEFRA, with the support of Accenture launched the Nature Handbook for Business - a practical resource for working towards a nature positive world aimed at five industry sectors, including tourism.

References

External links 
 
 International Centre for Responsible Tourism
 World Responsible Tourism Awards

Sustainable tourism